Osvaldo Morejón (born 11 December 1959) is a Bolivian racewalker. He competed in the men's 20 kilometres walk at the 1984 Summer Olympics.

References

1959 births
Living people
Athletes (track and field) at the 1984 Summer Olympics
Bolivian male racewalkers
Olympic athletes of Bolivia
World Athletics Championships athletes for Bolivia
Place of birth missing (living people)
South American Games gold medalists for Bolivia
South American Games medalists in athletics
Competitors at the 1978 Southern Cross Games